Josephine Mitchell (born 21 May 1965) sometimes credited as Jo Mitchell is an Australian actress and playwright with a lengthy career in theatre and television soap operas and serials.

Biography
Mitchells first major role was in Seven's drama series A Country Practice as Jo Loveday from 1985 and 1989. In 1990 she played Jane Holland in Home and Away, and has appeared in many of Australia's most popular series including, E Street (as designer and mother Penny O'Brien), Neighbours (as Katerina, a wheelchair user) and on All Saints as a one-episode guest, playing a protective mother who mutilated her husband after she found he had molested their daughter.
 
In 2010, after she returned to Home and Away, albeit as a different character that of Jill Carpenter a dysfunctional alcoholic mother, and the mother of Romeo, played by Luke Mitchell.

Both of Mitchell's parents were heavily involved in theatre and she has had an extensive career in her own right in theatre as well as many television and film roles. She started her own theatre company, Strut Theatre, with other actors to promote women's roles. Strut worked out of Wharf 2 at the Sydney Theatre Company in the early nineties. She produced two plays, Pam Gems and Dusa, Fish, Stas and Vi, as well as a commissioned play by Australian playwright, Justin Fleming called Conversation Peace. She then moved to Melbourne to appear in the National Tour of the musical Hello Dolly, produced by John Frost.

Personal life 
Jo Mitchell is married to Australian director and producer Chris Martin-Jones and they have two daughters. The pair met when Martin-Jones was a director on A Country Practice in 1989. His other credits include McLeod's Daughters, Packed to the Rafters, Spartacus, Legend of the Seeker, and A Place to Call Home.
    
She has a double degree from Sydney University, in Medieval and Religious Studies. She is currently focusing on her work behind the camera as writer, having finished a feature-length movie titled The Cult and the tele-movie Aren't U Spesh!.

Selected filmography

References

External links
 

Living people
1965 births
Australian soap opera actresses
Australian musical theatre actresses
University of Sydney alumni
Actresses from Sydney
People from Melbourne
20th-century Australian actresses
21st-century Australian women
21st-century Australian people